The Giessbach Funicular is a historic funicular in the Swiss canton of Bern and municipality of  Brienz. It links a landing stage on Lake Brienz, served by shipping services on the lake, to the Grand Hotel Giessbach and Giessbach Falls above. The funicular is owned by the hotel, but since 1983 has been operated by a preservation foundation.

Description
The Giessbach funicular was designed by the Swiss engineer Carl Roman Abt. When it was opened in 1879, it was the first funicular with a two-rail single track layout with a relatively short passing loop in the middle. Its turnouts had no moving parts, which was quite a remarkable achievement for the time. Abt had later developed its modification which became known as the Abt Switch.

Originally the funicular was powered by water ballast, and the Riggenbach rack rail in the middle of the track was used for speed control. In 1912 the water ballast system was replaced by a hydraulic engine powered by a Pelton turbine. Which is in its own turn was replaced in 1948 by an electric drive. The rack rail is currently used for emergency braking. The funicular's two wooden cars are restored back to their original appearance in 1879.

In 2015 the funicular was included in the list of Historic Mechanical Engineering Landmarks by the American Society of Mechanical Engineers under number 259.

Characteristics

The main characteristics of system are:

See also 
 List of funicular railways
 List of funiculars in Switzerland
 List of heritage railways and funiculars in Switzerland

Further reading

References

External links 
 Funicular turnout with Abt Switch, first installed at Giessbach 1879, Switzerland — a slide show by the ASME with drawings and diagrams
Giessbach Bahn page from Funimag
Grand Hotel Giessbach web site
The Giessbachbahn's entry on the Swiss Inventory of Ropeways

Funicular railways in Switzerland
Bernese Oberland
Former water-powered funicular railways converted to electricity
Metre gauge railways in Switzerland
Transport in the canton of Bern
Railway lines opened in 1879
Heritage railways in Switzerland